Nathan Jahmal Lyles (born October 8, 1985 in Chicago, Illinois) is a former American football safety. He was signed by the New York Jets as an undrafted free agent in 2008. He played for the Parma Panthers in the Italian Football League. Lyles played college football at Virginia.

Professional career

New York Jets
Lyles was signed by the Jets in May 2008. Lyles was later waived by the Jets on July 23, 2008 when cornerback Ahmad Carroll was signed. He was re-signed on July 31.  He was then waived by the team on August 18, 2008.

Parma Panthers
Lyles signed with the Panthers on February 15, 2011. On July 9, 2011 the Parma Panthers defeated the Bologna Warriors to win their second straight Italian Football League Super Bowl championship. The Panthers also played in the European Football League / Eurobowl playoffs where they lost to the Calanda Broncos from Switzerland in the second round.

External links
Virginia Cavaliers bio
Parma Panthers bio
Lyles Road To Recovery

1985 births
Living people
Players of American football from Chicago
American football safeties
Virginia Cavaliers football players
New York Jets players
American expatriate players of American football
American expatriate sportspeople in Italy